RoboSub is a competition whose goal is to advance the development of autonomous underwater vehicles (AUVs) by challenging a new generation of engineers to perform realistic missions in an underwater environment. It was launched in 1997 and is co-sponsored by the RoboNation (formerly the AUVSI Foundation) and the Office of Naval Research (ONR). The event also serves to foster ties between young engineers and the organizations developing AUV technologies. The competition is open to high school and college teams from around the world. Since about 2002, it has been held each summer at the U.S. Navy Space and Naval Warfare Systems Center Pacific's TRANSDEC Anechoic pool in San Diego, California. In 2022, the competition takes place at the University of Maryland, College Park.

Winners by year

There were no live competition winners in 2021 as the competition was held online. Instead, competitors were judged on submitted videos, reports, and website.

Detailed competition history

2022

Autonomy Challenge Awards

 National University of Singapore ($6,000)
 Amador Valley High School Robotics ($3,000)
 Carnegie Mellon University ($2,000)
 University of Alberta ($1,500)
 École de Technologie Supérieure ($1,000)
 Cornell University ($1,000)
Design Documentation
 National University of Singapore ($1,000)
 École de Technologie Supérieure ($750)
 The Ohio State University ($500)
 Underwater Robotics Club at NC State University
 Vortex NTNU

Judges Special Awards
 Best Report ($500): Duke University
 Best Online Presentation ($500): Wroclaw University of Science and Technology
 Best Link of Competition Strategy to Design Objectives ($500): Autonomous Maritime Robotics Association at Embry-Riddle
 Best Third Chance ($500): Indian Institute of Technology Bombay
 Inter-vehicle Communications ($250): École de Technologie Supérieure

2021 "Ides of TRANSDEC"

Mission
Per the Final Rules and Mission, "The fundamental goal of the mission is for an AUV to demonstrate its autonomy by completing an underwater Ides of TRANSDEC mission. The vehicle will be able to commence in training (dock/release buoys), pass over an obstacle course (PVC pipe to pass over), enter the gladiator ring (drop markers), Et tu Brute? (shoot torpedoes through a cutout), feed grapes to the emperor (manipulate a cylinder), and finally collect the Laurel wreath and crown the emperor (find a pinger, grab an object and move/release the object)."

Results

2020 
Overall Winners

 Team Inspiration -- $3,000
 Si Se Puede Foundation & Arizona State University -- $2,000
 Tecnológico de Monterrey -- $1,500
 San Diego State University -- $1,000
 Carnegie Mellon University -- $1,000
 University of Alberta -- $1,000

Video Winners

 Tecnológico de Monterrey -- $1,000
 Team Inspiration -- $800
 Indian Institute of Technology Bombay -- $600
 Si Se Puede Foundation & Arizona State University -- $400
 San Diego State University -- $200

Technical Design Report Winners

 Team Inspiration -- $1,000
 California Institute of Technology -- $800
 Si Se Puede Foundation & Arizona State University -- $600
 Duke University -- $400
 The Ohio State University -- $200

Website Winners

 Team Inspiration -- $1,000
 Si Se Puede Foundation & Arizona State University -- $800
 Amador Valley High School -- $600
 Tecnológico de Monterrey -- $400
 École de Technologie Supérieure -- $200

Special Awards

 Holding Steady ($500): Federal University of Rio de Janeiro
 Newest Players ($500): Ain Shams University
 Pixelated RoboSub ($500): National University of Singapore

2019
 Harbin Engineering University -- $6,000
 Far Eastern Federal University / Institute for Marine Technology Problems -- $4,000
 Arizona State University Polytechnic -- $3,000
 University of Alberta -- $2,000
 Cornell University -- $1,000

 Best Static Judging: National University of Singapore
 First to Pre-Qualify: University of Alberta
 Most Inspirational: Team Inspiration
 Data Sharing: The Ohio State University
 Best Website: École de Technologie Supérieure
 Most Improved: California Institute of Technology
 Most Entertaining Video: The Center for Robotics Development

2018
 Harbin Engineering University -- $7,000
 National University of Singapore -- $6,000
 California Institute of Technology -- $2,500
 École de Technologie Supérieure -- $2,500
 Cornell University

2017
 Cornell University, USA ($4,500)
 Far Eastern University/Institute for Marine Technology Problems, Russia ($4,000)
 National University of Singapore, Singapore ($3,000)
 Harbin Engineering University, China ($2,000)
 Georgia Institute of Technology, USA ($1,000)
 Best PR:   San Diego State University, USA ($1,000)

2016
 California Institute of Technology, $6,000
 Indian Institute of Technology, Bombay, $5,000
 Cornell University, $2,000
 G.I. Nevelskoy Maritime State University, $1,500
 Kasetsart University & Chulalongkorn University, $1,500
 Harbin Engineering University, $1,000
 McGill University, $1,000

2015
 San Diego State University, $6,000
 National University of Singapore, $4,000
 Maritime State University, $3,000
 California Institute of Technology, $1,000
 University of Arizona: $1,000 
 Far Eastern Federal University, $1,000 
 Amador Valley High School, $1,000

2014
 Cornell University (awarded $10,000)
 University of Florida (awarded $5,000)
 Team SONIA - École de Technologie Supérieure  (Canada) (awarded $1,000)
 Far Eastern Federal University (Russian Federation) (awarded $1,000)
 National University of Singapore (Singapore) (awarded $1,000)
 Reykjavik University (Iceland)
 California Institute of Technology
 San Diego State University Mechatronics Club
 Harbin Engineering University (China)
 McGill University (Canada)
 Daytona Beach Area Homeschoolers - Team S.S. Minnow
 University of Arizona
 Amador Valley High School
 Mälardalen University (Sweden)
 India Institute of Technology Madras (India)
 University of Alberta (Canada)
 Kyushu Institute of Technology (Japan)
 Kasetsart University (Thailand)
 Carl Hayden High School - Falcon Robotics
 Embry-Riddle Aerospace University
 Palouse Robosub Club (Washington/Idaho)
 San Diego City College
 Prairie View A&M University
 Nautilus
 University of Maryland
 India Institute of Technology Bombay (India)
 Team Bangalore Robotics (India)
 University of Colorado Boulder  
 San Diego City Robotics 101
 University of Southern California
 Istanbul Technical University (Turkey)
 University of Toronto (Canada)
 St. Georges School (Canada)
 Delhi Technical University (India)
 California Southern Polytechnic University
 Ain Shams University (Egypt)
 Montana State University
 Southern Polytechnic State University (Georgia)
 RoboEgypt (Egypt)

 Best New Entry: California Institute of Technology (awarded $500)
 Best Branding: McGill University (awarded $500)
 International Collaboration Team Bangalore Robotics (awarded $500)
 Mayor's Cup for Outreach: Team SONIA - École de Technologie Supérieure (Canada)(awarded $500)

2013
 Cornell University (awarded $8,000)
 University of Florida (awarded $4,000)
 Far Eastern Federal University (Russian Federation)(awarded $3,000)
 University of Maryland (awarded $1,000)
 Harbin Engineering University (China)(awarded $1,000)
 Amador Valley High School
 National University of Singapore (Singapore)
 Carl Hayden High School - Falcon Robotics
 Best Static Judging: Team SONIA - École de Technologie Supérieure (Canada)(awarded $500)
 Best Journal Paper: Cornell University (awarded $500)
 Best Bang for the Buck: Daytona Beach Area Homeschoolers - Team S.S. Minnow (awarded $500)
 Best New Entry: National University of Singapore (Singapore)(awarded $500)
 Best Outreach Programs: Embry-Riddle Aeronautical University, North Carolina State University, Carl Hayden High School (awarded $500 each)

2012
 Cornell University (awarded $8,000)
 University of Florida (awarded $4,000)
 Team SONIA - École de Technologie Supérieure  (Canada)(awarded $3,000)
 Harbin Engineering University (China)(awarded $1,000)
 Far Eastern Federal University (Russian Federation)(awarded $1,000)
 University of Maryland (awarded $1,000)
 Static Judging: Cornell University
 Craftsmanship: Mälardalen University
 Best new entry: Far Eastern Federal University
 Gladiator challenge: University of Central Florida
 Mayor's Cup for Community Outreach: San Diego City College

2011
 ETS Team SONIA (awarded $7,000) 
 Cornell University (awarded $4000) 
 University of Florida (awarded $3,000) 
 Reykjavik University (awarded $2,000) 
 University of Maryland (awarded $500) 
 University of Rhode Island ($500) 
 United States Naval Academy 
 North Carolina State 
 Mayor's Cup for Community Outreach: Carl Hayden High School (awarded $1,000) 
 Second Chance Award: University of Central Florida (awarded $1,000) 
 Outstanding Technical Mentorship: University of Maryland ($500) 
 Hardware is Hard Award: Utah State University (awarded $500) 
 Innovation on a Budget Award: Mesa College 
 Best Paper Award: Kyushu University

2010
 Cornell ($6,000 Prize)
 U.S. Naval Academy ($5,000)
 University of Maryland ($2,250)
 ETS ($1,750)
 Amador Valley High School ($1,000)
 University of Texas at Dallas ($1,000)
 Kyushu Institute of Technology ($1,000)
 University of Central Florida: Second Chance Award ($,1000)
 San Diego City College: Best Group Presentation ($500)
 Reykjavik University: Determination Award ($500)

2009
 Cornell University ($10K)
 University of Victoria ($4K)
 University of Rhode Island ($3K)
 UCF
 U Texas @ Dallas
 USC
 FAU
 U Maryland
 Kyushu Institute of Tech
 ETS
 Amador
 iBotics
 US Naval Academy
 Delhi College of Engineering
 SDCR
 NC State U
 Saint George's
 VT
 U Toronto MDA
 U Florida
 ARVP
 MIT
 SPSU
 Embry Riddle
 KAIST
 UWF
 U Ottawa
 Pacific Nautilus
 U Colorado @ Denver
 McGill U
Best New Team: St. Georges ($1000)
Most with the Least: Florida Atlantic University ($500)
Best technical paper: Kyushu ($500)
TSA Award: Embry Riddle ($500) (vehicle was significantly damaged in shipping by the TSA)

2008
 University of Maryland
 University of Texas at Dallas
 École de technologie supérieure
 University of Florida
 United States Naval Academy
 University of Victoria
 Cornell University
 Florida Atlantic University
 Delhi College of Engineering
 San Diego City College
 San Diego iBotics
 University of Ottawa
 Amador Valley High School
 Southern Methodist University
 University of Southern California
 Georgia Tech
 University of Alberta
 University of Colorado at Boulder
 Kyushu Institute of Technology
 Universite Laval
 Southern Polytechnic State University
 University of West Florida
 University of Wisconsin
 North Carolina State University
 Norwich University

2007
 University of Florida, USA
 University of Rhode Island, Dept. of Ocean Engineering, USA
 École de Technologie Supérieure, CANADA
 Cornell University, USA
 University of Central Florida, USA
 University of Southern California, USA
 United States Naval Academy, USA
 Southern Polytechnic State University, USA
 Pacific Nautilus San Diego City College, USA
 University of Maryland, USA
 Southern Methodist University, USA
 Smurphs Pair, Home School, USA
 Amador Valley High School Robotics Club, USA
 University of Colorado at Denver, USA
 NW AUV Fellowship, USA
 University of Victoria, CANADA
 Virginia Tech AUVT, USA
 University of Ottawa, CANADA
 Duke University, USA
 University of Texas at Dallas, USA
 Delhi College of Engineering, INDIA
 Georgia Tech, USA
 San Diego iBotics AUV, USA
 University of Toronto, CANADA
 MIT, USA
 North Carolina State University, USA
 Kyushu Institute of Technology, JAPAN

2006
 University of Florida
 Duke University
 Ecole de technologie superieure
 University of Rhode Island
 University of Texas at Dallas
 Massachusetts Institute of Technology
 Cornell University
 University of Central Florida
 North Carolina State University
 Southern Polytechnic State University
 University of Toronto
 Virginia Tech
 University of Ottawa
 University of Victoria
 Amador Valley High School
 Georgia Tech
 San Diego City College
 University of Colorado Denver
 University of Southern California
 Kyushu Institute of Technology
 Indian Underwater Robotics Society
 Best New Entry - University of Toronto
 Best New Design - University of Central Florida

2005
 University of Florida
 Ecole de Technologie Superieure
 MIT
 Duke University
 Amador Valley High School
 University of Rhode Island
 University of Southern California
 Cornell University
 University of Colorado at Denver
 Southern Polytechnic State University
 University of Texas at Dallas
 Georgia Tech - Marine Robotics Society
 University of Central Florida
 Virginia Tech
 University of Ottawa
 University of Victoria
 DeVry
 North Carolina State University
 Indian Underwater Robotics Society
 No Guts No Glory: Ecole de Technologie Superieure
 Docking Dollars: Duke University
 Best New Entry: Georgia Tech - Marine Robotics Society

2004
 Massachusetts Institute of Technology
 Cornell University
 Ecole de technologie superieure
 University of Rhode Island
 Duke University
 University of Ottawa
 University of Florida
 Amador Valley High School
 University of Texas at Dallas
 University of Victoria
 Virginia Tech
 Pacific Northwest AUV Fellowship
 San Diego State University
 University of Colorado at Denver
 University of Central Florida
 Southern Polytechnic State University
 Brigham Young University - Hawaii
 University Southern California
 Best Newcomer: University of Ottawa
 Lightest Entry: Brigham Young University - Hawaii
 Most Innovative: Duke University

2003
 Cornell University
 Ecole de technologie superieure (Montreal)
 Duke
 MIT
 Amador Valley High School
 University of Rhode Island
 Hammerhead AUV Fellowship
 University of Florida
 University of Colorado - Denver
 University of Victoria
 University of West Florida
 Virginia Tech

2002
 MIT
 Cornell University
 University of Florida
 Duke
 Amador Valley High School
 University of Rhode Island
 Ecole de technologie superieure
 Florida Atlantic University
 Team Tortuga
 U.S. Naval Academy
 Saratoga and Monta Vista High Schools
 University of Victoria
 University of West Florida
 University of Colorado - Denver
 DeVry—Calgary

2001
 MIT
 Amador Valley High School
 University of Florida
 University of Rhode Island
 Cornell University
 University of Colorado at Denver
 Duke/North Carolina State Universities
 Florida Atlantic University
 U.S. Naval Academy
 Monta Vista High School
 Ecole de Technologie Superieure
 Stevens Institute of Technology
 Good Neighbor Award: University of Colorado-Denver
 Bang for the Buck Award: Monta Vista High School
 Best New Entry: Duke and N.C. State Universities

2000
 University of Rhode Island 
 (tie) Cornell University and MIT 
 US Naval Academy 
 University of W. Florida 
 Cal Poly San Luis Obispo 
 Amador Valley High School 
 University of Florida 
 Stevens Inst. of Technology 
 Florida Atlantic University 
 University of Colorado - Denver 
 Ecole de Technologie Superieure (Montreal)

1999
 MIT
 University of Florida
 Florida Atlantic University
 Honorable Mention: U.S. Naval Academy 
 Honorable Mention: Stevens Institute of Technology

1998
 MIT
 Stevens Institute of Technology
 University of Florida
 Johns Hopkins University

External links
RoboSub official site

References

Science and technology in the United States
Engineering competitions